is a Japanese garden attached to a former tea ceremony room in Chuo-ku, Fukuoka, Japan.

History
The Shōfū-en garden was built in early 1950s by Zenpachi Tanakamaru, the founder of Fukuoka Tamaya (:ja:福岡玉屋), once one of the major department stores in Fukuoka, was located here.

The old house named Shofu-so (松風荘), originally the private residence of the Tanakamaru family. The site of the house went under a renewal and reopened in July 2007 as Shofu-en park. Shofu-an (松風庵), the tea room which was long used by Tanakamaru family is preserved in its original condition.

The Fukuoka Municipal Zoo and Botanical Garden is nearby.

References

External links
  
 Yokanavi.com 

Geography of Fukuoka
Gardens in Fukuoka Prefecture
Gardens in Japan